Elephant fish may refer to:

 Fish
 Callorhinchidae, a family of marine fish also known as elephant sharks or plough-nose chimaeras
 Mormyridae, a family of African freshwater fish that sometimes are kept in aquariums

 Other
Gajamina, an elephant-fish mythical figure used in funeral ceremonies in Bali, Indonesia